L. Scott Frantz (born June 29, 1960) is an American businessman and politician. He is a former member of the Connecticut State Senate.

Early life and education 
Leroy Scott Frantz was born to Leroy Frantz, Jr. (1927-2002) and his first wife Ann (née Haebler; d. 1988) in Hartford and raised in Greenwich,Connecticut. His maternal grandfather, Dr. William T. Haebler, was the founder and majority owner of International Flavors & Fragrances, Inc. (IFF). His father Leroy was a former executive at the company, through which connection he met his wife. The name of Frantz' investment company is derived from his maternal grandfather. Leroy Frantz, Jr. later owned the Dutch airline Transavia, and Marina America, a large shipyard and boat repair facility, located in Stamford. He had two brothers, his twin brother died in a helicopter accident. 

Frantz attended The Hotchkiss School in Salisbury, Connecticut and graduated with an A.B. in politics from Princeton University in 1982, after completing a 244-page long senior thesis, titled "New Right Lobbying and the Death of Salt II". He later received an MBA from Tuck School of Business at Dartmouth College.

Career 
Frantz, a Republican, was first elected to the Connecticut Senate in 2008, representing the 36th Senate District, which includes all of Greenwich and parts of Stamford and New Canaan. He lost to Greenwich Democrat Alexandra Bergstein in the 2018 election, ending a nearly 90-year Republican hold on the seat. Frantz also served as chairman of the Connecticut Development Authority and the Bradley International Airport Board of Directors. He also has served on number of other public and nonprofit boards, including the Connecticut Brownfield Redevelopment Authority, the Greenwich Teen Center and Corporate Angel Network. He is also known as a prominent fundraiser for Republican candidates, including serving as the host for a 2006 Republican event featuring President George W. Bush. 

Frantz is the president and chairman of Haebler Capital, a private investment capital firm based in Greenwich, which was founded in 1965 as a family investment vehicle.

Private 
On December 18, 1993 he married Allison Icy Hanley, of Greenwich. Her father was William L. Hanley, Jr., an heir to the Hanley Company (Petroleum, Brick), as well as a civic leader in Greenwich and prominent Republican Party ally of Ronald Reagan. 

He has four children and resides in the Riverside section of Greenwich.

References

Living people
1960 births
Republican Party Connecticut state senators
Hotchkiss School alumni
Princeton University alumni
Tuck School of Business alumni
Businesspeople from Greenwich, Connecticut
21st-century American politicians
People from Riverside, Connecticut